This is a list of episodes for the television series Hart to Hart. This series consists of a 2-hour pilot, five seasons of episodes, and eight TV-movies.

Series overview
At present, the pilot, the first two seasons, and all of the TV-movies have been released on DVD by Sony Pictures Home Entertainment. Seasons three, four, and five have been released by Shout! Factory.

Episodes

Pilot (1979)

Season 1 (1979–80)

Season 2 (1980–81)

Season 3 (1981–82)

Season 4 (1982–83)

Season 5 (1983–84)

TV-movies (1993–96)

References

External links
 
 TV-movies at the Internet Movie Database:
 Hart to Hart: Crimes of the Hart
 Hart to Hart: Harts in High Season
 Hart to Hart: Home Is Where the Hart Is
 Hart to Hart: Old Friends Never Die
 Hart to Hart Returns
 Hart to Hart: Secrets of the Hart
 Hart to Hart: Till Death Do Us Hart
 Hart to Hart: Two Harts in 3/4 Time

Lists of American crime television series episodes
Lists of American action television series episodes